Scleropogon helvolus is a species of robber flies (insects in the family Asilidae).

References

Further reading

External links

 Diptera.info

Asilidae